Ivbiosakon, or Aoma, is an Edoid language of Edo State, Nigeria. The dialect names Ora and Emai are also used for the language.

Phonology

(The other approximants, are also nasalized in this position: see Edo language for a similar situation.) The inventory is:

References

Edoid languages